The Chevrolet Standard (Series DC) was launched in 1933, initially as the Chevrolet Standard Mercury, by Chevrolet as a lower priced alternative to the 1932 Chevrolet Series BA Confederate that became the Master Eagle in 1933  and Master from 1934. It was advertised as the cheapest six-cylinder enclosed car on the market.

The Standard was offered in three body styles all on a 107-inch wheelbase: 2-door sedan (a body style Chevrolet customarily referred to as a "coach" in marketing at the time), coupe and coupe with rumble seat. All bodies were by Fisher and featured 'no-draft ventilation'. This engine had first appeared in Chevrolet's 1929 models, introduced in 1928. The car had full instrumentation. A clock, heater and a radio were options. For 1934, sedan, roadster and touring body styles were added to the catalog.

A sedan delivery was also available this year.

For 1936, the Standard Six received a wide range of improvements and a wider choice of body styles including cabriolet and sports sedan versions. It was built on a new box-girder frame with a wheel base of 109 inches. The spare wheel moved from its external rear trunk location to a new compartment under the trunk. Brakes were 11-in drums. The steel roof was new.

The Standard Six was discontinued for 1937 when the Master range was joined by the new Master Deluxe. In May of 1925 the Chevrolet Export Boxing plant at Bloomfield, New Jersey was repurposed from a previous owner where Knock-down kits for Chevrolet, Oakland, Oldsmobile, Buick and Cadillac passenger cars, and both Chevrolet and G. M. C. truck parts are crated and shipped by railroad to the docks at Weehawken, New Jersey for overseas GM assembly factories.

See also
1933 Cadillac Series 355
1933 LaSalle Series 303
1933 Oldsmobile F-Series
1933 Buick Series 50
1933 Pontiac

References

Standard
Cars introduced in 1933
1930s cars
Rear-wheel-drive vehicles